Lilia Guadalupe Merodio Reza (Ciudad Juárez, Chihuahua, September 19, 1978) is a Mexican politician, currently serving in the Senate and representing the state of Chihuahua.

Life
Merodio studied business administration at the Universidad Autónoma de Ciudad Juárez, graduating in 2001. She headed the Water and Sanitation Board of Ciudad Juárez from 2001 to 2002 and sat on the city council from 2002 to 2004. From 2001 to 2004, she was the President of University Students in the Professional Forum of the local chapter of the Confederación Nacional de Organizaciones Populares. From 2004 to 2006, she headed the city's human resources department and also served as a technical secretary on a commission about low voter turnout.

Voters in the Second District of Chihuahua sent Merodio to the Chamber of Deputies for the LX Legislature, where she served from 2006 to 2009. She was the vice coordinator of the PRI parliamentary group in the chamber and secretary of the Board of Directors. She also served as the secretary of the Communications Commission and on four others: Equity and Gender; Youth and Sports; National Defense; and Population, Borders and Migratory Matters.

With her term as deputy done, Merodio primarily served in PRI party positions, as a city-level agenda coordinator, representative of the Chihuahua state government in Mexico City, and administrative secretary for the national PRI.

Chihuahua sent Merodio back to Congress in 2012, this time to the Senate for the LXII and LXIII Legislatures. She presides over the Commission on Care for Vulnerable Groups and is on five further commissions: Youth and Sports, Health, Communications and Transportation, Finances and Public Credit, and Foreign Relations/Asia-Pacific.

Between December 2015 and January 2016, Merodio asked for license to leave the Senate, hoping to be named the PRI gubernatorial candidate, but was eventually bypassed in favor of Enrique Serrano Escobar. She was temporarily replaced by her alternate, deputy Adriana Terrazas Porras. Ultimately, Merodio joined Escobar's campaign as a statewide liaison and coordinator. She also served as a link between the gubernatorial campaign and those of state legislators and mayors.

References

1978 births
Living people
Institutional Revolutionary Party politicians
Members of the Senate of the Republic (Mexico)
Members of the Chamber of Deputies (Mexico)
People from Ciudad Juárez
21st-century Mexican politicians
21st-century Mexican women politicians
Women members of the Chamber of Deputies (Mexico)
Women members of the Senate of the Republic (Mexico)
Politicians from Chihuahua (state)
Universidad Autónoma de Ciudad Juárez alumni
Senators of the LXII and LXIII Legislatures of Mexico